Oskélanéo Lake is a freshwater body linked to the southwestern part of the Gouin Reservoir (via Bureau Lake (Gouin Reservoir), in the territory of the town of La Tuque, in the administrative region of Mauricie, in the province of Quebec, in Canada.

This lake extends entirely in the canton of Faucher. Following the completion of the Gouin Dam in 1948, the navigability between the Gouin Reservoir and Lake Oskélanéo becomes even easier with only two meters of difference in elevation.

Recreotourism activities are the main economic activity of the sector. Forestry comes second.

The Canadian National Railway (East-West) cuts Oskélanéo Lake in its middle through the village of Oskélanéo, located on the West Bank.

A few secondary forest roads are in use nearby for forestry and recreational tourism activities.

The surface of Oskélanéo Lake is usually frozen from mid-November to the end of April, however, safe ice circulation is generally from early December to late March.

Geography

Toponymy
The toponym "Lac Oskélanéo" was formalized on December 5, 1968, by the Commission de toponymie du Québec, when it was created.

Notes and references

See also 

Lakes of Mauricie
La Tuque, Quebec